There have been two baronetcies created for persons with the surname Duckworth, both in the Baronetage of the United Kingdom.

The Duckworth Baronetcy, of Topsham in the County of Devon, was created in the Baronetage of the United Kingdom on 2 November 1813 for the naval commander John Thomas Duckworth. The second Baronet sat as Member of Parliament for Exeter from 1845 to 1857. The title became extinct on his death in 1887.

The Duckworth Baronetcy, of Grosvenor Place in the City of Westminster, was created in the Baronetage of the United Kingdom on 15 July 1909 for the prominent physician Sir Dyce Duckworth. He was Treasurer of the Royal College of Physicians from 1884 to 1923 and Honorary Physician to Edward VII when Prince of Wales from 1890 to 1901.

Duckworth baronets, of Topsham (1813)
Sir John Thomas Duckworth, 1st Baronet (died 1817) 
Sir John Thomas Buller Duckworth, 2nd Baronet (1809–1887)

Duckworth baronets, of Grosvenor Place (1909) 

Sir Dyce Duckworth, 1st Baronet (1840–1928) 
Sir Edward Dyce Duckworth, 2nd Baronet (1875–1945) 
Sir Richard Dyce Duckworth, 3rd Baronet (1918–1997) 
Sir Edward Richard Dyce Duckworth, 4th Baronet (1943–2005) 
Sir James Edward Dyce Duckworth, 5th Baronet (born 1984)

The heir presumptive to the baronetcy is Antony George Dyce Duckworth (born 1946), 2nd son of the 3rd Baronet and uncle to the current Baronet.

See also
Duckworth-King baronets

References

Kidd, Charles, Williamson, David (editors). Debrett's Peerage and Baronetage (1990 edition). New York: St Martin's Press, 1990.

Baronetcies in the Baronetage of the United Kingdom
Extinct baronetcies in the Baronetage of the United Kingdom